Polona Hercog was the defending champion, but chose to participate at the Swedish Open instead. Petra Cetkovská won the all-Czech final, defeating Denisa Allertová 3–6, 6–1, 6–4.

Seeds

Main draw

Finals

Top half

Bottom half

References 
 Main draw

Its Cup - Singles
ITS Cup